Pine Creek, Northern Territory is a town and locality in the Northern Territory of Australia.

Pine Creek may also refer to:

Pine Creek bioregion, an interim Australian bioregion
Pine Creek Airfield, a disused airfield
Pine Creek railway station, a former railway station and museum

See also
Pine Creek (disambiguation)